Copper(II) stearate is a metal-organic compound, a salt of copper and stearic acid with the formula Cu(C17H35COO)2. The compound is classified as a metallic soap, i.e. a metal derivative of a fatty acid.

Synthesis
Exchange reaction of sodium stearate and copper sulfate:

Physical properties
Copper(II) stearate forms a blue-green amorphous substance similar to plasticine both in appearance and touch. 

Insoluble in water, ethanol, or methanol.

Soluble in ether, pyridine, hot benzene, and chloroform.

Chemical properties
The compound is stable and non-reactive under normal conditions.

When trying to ignite, copper stearate first melts and then begins to burn with a green (at the base) flame, then it quickly turns black due to the formation of cupric oxide:

Uses
The compound is used in the production of antifouling paint and varnish materials.

Also used as a component in casting bronze sculptures.

Also applies as a catalyst for the decomposition of hydroperoxides.

References

Stearates
Copper compounds